Below a list of all national champions in the Men's Decathlon event in track and field from several countries since 1980.

Australia

1980: Peter Hadfield
1981: Peter Hadfield
1982: Peter Hadfield
1983: Peter Hadfield
1984: Peter Hadfield
1985: Peter Hadfield
1986: Simon Shirley
1987: Stuart Andrews
1988: Simon Shirley
1989: Chris Bradshaw
1990: Paul Scott
1991: Paul Scott
1992: Dean Smith
1993: Peter Winter
1994: Dean Smith
1995: Leslie Kuorikoski
1996: Peter Winter
1997: Peter Banks
1998: Jagan Hames
1999: Scott Ferrier
2000: Klaus Ambrosch (AUT)
2001: Matthew McEwen
2002: Scott Ferrier
2003: Matthew McEwen
2004: Matthew McEwen
2005: Eric Surjan
2006: Jason Dudley
2007: Eric Surjan
2008: Jason Dudley
2009: Brent Newdick (NZL)
2010: Stephen Cain
2011: Jarrod Sims
2012: Jarrod Sims
2013: Kyle McCarthy
2014: Jake Stein
2015: David Brock
2016: Cedric Dubler
2017: Cedric Dubler
2018: Cedric Dubler
2019: Daniel Golubovic (USA)

Austria

1980: Georg Werthner
1981: Sepp Zeilbauer
1982: Georg Werthner
1983: Wolfgang Spann
1984: Georg Werthner
1985: Jürgen Mandl
1986: Georg Werthner
1987: Michael Arnold
1988: Georg Werthner
1989: Gernot Kellermayr
1990: Michael Arnold
1991: Erwin Reiterer
1992: Martin Krenn
1993: Leonard Hudec
1994: Leonard Hudec
1995: Gerhard Röser
1996: Thomas Tebbich
1997: Thomas Tebbich
1998: Klaus Ambrosch
1999: Klaus Ambrosch
2000: Thomas Lorber
2001: Markus Walser
2002: Klaus Ambrosch
2003: Roland Schwarzl
2004: Thomas Tebbich
2005: Markus Walser
2006: Johannes Künz
2007: Markus Walser
2008: Fabian Mayrhofer
2009: Dominik Distelberger

Belgium

1980: Piet Van Vaerenbergh
1981: Roland Marloye
1982: Piet Van Vaerenbergh
1983: Piet Van Vaerenbergh
1984: Roland Marloye
1985: Roland Marloye
1986: Roland Marloye
1987: Erwin Van Nieuwenhove
1988: Roland Marloye
1989: Erwin Van Nieuwenhove
1990: Vincent Verleye
1991: Vincent Verleye
1992: Bert Van Opstel
1993: Vincent Verleye
1994: Raf Coomans
1995: Serge De Smet
1996: Serge De Smet
1997: Wim Van Meerbeeck
1998: Raf Coomans
1999: Serge De Smet
2000: Steve De Baer
2001: Serge De Smet
2002: Frank Vandaele
2003: Frédéric Xhonneux
2004: François Gourmet
2005: Hans Van Alphen
2006: Frédéric Xhonneux
2007: Frédéric Xhonneux
2008: Denis Goossens
2009: Bruno Carton-Delcourt
2010: Thomas Van Der Plaetsen
2011: Frédéric Xhonneux
2012: Bruno Carton-Delcourt
2013: Frédéric Xhonneux

Bulgaria

1980: Razvigor Yankov
1981: Atanas Andonov
1982: Tsetsko Mitrakiev
1983: Tsetsko Mitrakiev
1984: Tsetsko Mitrakiev
1985: Tsetsko Mitrakiev
1986: Tsetsko Mitrakiev
1987: Tsetsko Mitrakiev
1988: Borislav Kolev
1989: Georgi Arnaoudov
1990: Asen Aleksandrov
1991: Georgi Arnaoudov
1992: Krasimir Petlichki
1993: Krasimir Petlichki
1994: Krasimir Petlichki
1995: Krasimir Petlichki
1996: Georgi Petrov
1997: Dimitar Georgiev
1998: Boris Vodenizharov
1999: Vladislav Iliev
2000: Marin Karailiev
2001: Miroslav Shishkov
2002: Angel Kararadev
2003: Kaloyan Kirov
2004: Kiril Osev
2005: Borislav Borisov
2006: Borislav Borisov

Canada

1980: Steve Kemp
1981: Rob Town
1982: Dave Steen
1983: Milan Popadich
1984: Milan Popadich
1985: Greg Haydenluck
1986: Dave Steen
1987: Greg Haydenluck
1988: Richard Hesketh
1989: Mike Smith
1990: Mike Smith
1991: Garth Peet
1992: Garth Peet
1993: David Cook
1994: Mike Smith
1995: Mike Smith
1996: Matt Jeffrey
1997: Antonie Scholtz
1998: Dave Stewart
1999: Mike Nolan
2000: Mike Nolan
2001: Mike Nolan
2002: Mike Nolan
2003: Mike Nolan
2004: Josef Karas
2005: James Holder
2006: Massimo Bertocchi
2007: Massimo Bertocchi
2008: Massimo Bertocchi
2009: Reid Gustavson
2010: Jamie Adjetey Nelson
2011: Damian Warner
2012: Damian Warner

Cuba

1986: Ernesto Betancourt
1987: Miguel Valle
1988: Luis Milanes
1989: Unknown
1990: Luis Milanes
1991: Eugenio Balanqué
1992: Ernesto Betancourt
1993: Eugenio Balanqué
1994: Eugenio Balanqué
1995: Raúl Duany
1996: Raúl Duany
1997: Jorge Moreno
1998: Yonelvis Águila
1999: Yonelvis Águila
2000: Raúl Duany
2001: Yonelvis Águila
2002: Yonelvis Águila
2003: Yonelvis Águila
2004: Alberto Juantorena Jr.
2005: Alexis Chivás
2006: Yordanis García

Czechoslovakia

1980: Jirí Knejp
1981: Petr Šárec
1982: Martin Machura
1983: Martin Machura
1984: Martin Machura
1985: Martin Machura
1986: Roman Hraban
1987: Veroslav Valenta
1988: Petr Horn
1989: Lubomír Matoušek
1990: Veroslav Valenta
1991: Petr Horn
1992: Kamil Damašek

Czech Republic

1993: Kamil Damašek
1994: Kamil Damašek
1995: Kamil Damašek
1996: Roman Šebrle
1997: Kamil Damašek
1998: Aleš Paštrnák
1999: Tomáš Komenda
2000: Aleš Paštrnák
2001: Pavel Havlícek
2002: Jan Podebradský
2003: Vít Zákoucký
2004: Jan Podebradský
2005: Josef Karas
2006: Josef Karas

Denmark

1984: Mikkel Sørensen
1985: Morten Blumensaat
1986: Lars Warming
1987: Lars Warming
1988: Lars Warming
1989: Lars Warming
1990: Poul Gundersen
1991: Lars Warming
1992: Lars Warming
1993: Poul Gundersen
1994: Carsten Bomme
1995: Søren Johansson
1996: Thor Rasmussen
1997: Niels Uth
1998: Poul Gundersen
1999: Anders Black
2000: Piotr Buciarski
2001: Niels Uth
2002: Piotr Buciarski
2003: Anders Black
2004: Anders Black
2005: Anders Black
2006: Niels Uth
2007: Niels Uth

Estonia

1920: Aleksander Klumberg
1921: -
1922: Eugen Neumann
1923: Heinrich Paal
1924: Aleksander Klumberg
1925: Elmar Rähn
1926: Richard Ivask
1927: Mihkel Liinat
1928: Evald Kink
1929: Johann Meimer
1930: Johann Meimer
1931: Edgar Tamm
1932: Arnold Niggol
1933: Arnold Niggol
1934: Elmar Lilienthal
1935: Elmar Lilienthal
1936: Elmar Rähn
1937: Elmar Lilienthal
1938: Heino Koik
1939: Toivo Õunap
1940: Heino Koik
1941: -
1942: Paul Toomla
1943: Johannes Rander
1944: Heino Lipp
1945: Paul Toomla
1946: Heino Lipp
1947: Heino Lipp
1948: Karl Lont
1949: Heino Lipp
1950: Heino Lipp
1951: Viktor Hellerma
1952: Heino Tiik
1953: Pavel Šenitsev
1954: Heino Tiik
1955: Uno Palu
1956: Uno Palu
1957: Aleksander Transtok
1958: Uno Palu
1959: Heinrich Kriivan
1960: Uno Palu
1961: Rein Aun
1962: Heino Tiik
1963: Uno Palu
1964: Uno Palu
1965: Priit Paalo
1966: Priit Paalo
1967: Priit Paalo
1968: Rein Tõru
1969: Kaidu Meitern
1970: Heino Sildoja
1971: Jaan Lember
1972: Kaidu Meitern
1973: Peeter Põld
1974: Peeter Põld
1975: Peep Tõnisson
1976: Toomas Suurväli
1977: Tõnu Kaukis
1978: Toomas Suurväli
1979: Margus Kasearu
1980: Tõnu Kaukis
1981: Valter Külvet
1982: Sven Reintak
1983: Urmas Käen
1984: Sven Reintak
1985: Sven Reintak
1986: Tiit Pahker
1987: Tiit Pahker
1988: Aivar Haller
1989: Ain Arro
1990: Erki Nool
1991: Indrek Kaseorg
1992: Erki Nool
1993: Indrek Kaseorg
1994: Valter Külvet
1995: Valter Külvet
1996: Raido Mägi
1997: Raido Mägi
1998: Sven Simuste
1999: Aivo Normak
2000: Aivo Normak
2001: Indrek Kaseorg
2002: Villu Sepp
2003: Indrek Kaseorg
2004: Päärn Brauer
2005: Andres Raja
2006: Andres Raja
2007: Aigar Kukk
2008: Mikk Pahapill
2009: Indrek Turi
2010: Andres Raja
2011: Tarmo Riitmuru
2012: Hendrik Lepik
2013: Andres Raja
2014: Kaarel Jõeväli
2015: Taavi Tšernjavski
2016: Kristjan Rosenberg
2017: Taavi Tšernjavski
2018: Taavi Tšernjavski
2019: Janek Õiglane
2020: Risto Lillemets
2021: Kristjan Rosenberg
2022: Maicel Uibo

Finland

1980: Johannes Lahti
1981: Kari-Pekka Lax
1982: Johannes Lahti
1983: Jarmo Mäkelä
1984: Harri Sundell
1985: Henrik Broman
1986: Henrik Broman
1987: Petri Keskitalo
1988: Kaj Ekman
1989: Mikko Valle
1990: Kaj Ekman
1991: Jari Näkki
1992: Mikko Valle
1993: Mikko Valle
1994: Jarkko Finni
1995: Mikko Valle
1996: Mikko Valle
1997: Mikko Valle
1998: Mikko Valle
1999: Glenn Lindqvist
2000: Eduard Hämäläinen
2001: Jukka Väkeväinen
2002: Jukka Väkeväinen
2003: Henri Kokkonen
2004: Jaakko Ojaniemi
2005: Aki Heikkinen
2006: Lassi Raunio
2007: Jaakko Ojaniemi
2008: Jaakko Ojaniemi
2009: Tero Ojala
2010: Lassi Raunio
2011: Sami Itani

France

1980: Jean-Philippe Sommero
1981: Yves Le Roy
1982: Didier Claverie
1983: Didier Claverie
1984: Frédéric Sacco
1985: William Motti
1986: Alain Blondel
1987: Christian Plaziat
1988: Christian Plaziat
1989: Christian Plaziat
1990: Christian Plaziat
1991: William Motti
1992: Alain Blondel
1993: Not Held
1994: Sébastien Levicq
1995: Olivier Coche
1996: Wilfrid Boulineau
1997: Lionel Marceny
1998: Gaëtan Blouin
1999: Cédric Lopez
2000: Laurent Hernu
2001: Gaëtan Blouin
2002: Laurent Hernu
2003: Laurent Hernu
2004: Gaëtan Blouin
2005: Romain Barras
2006: Nadir El Fassi
2007: Rudy Bourguignon
2008: Franck Logel
2009: Nadir El Fassi

Germany

East Germany

1980: Dietmar Jentsch
1981: Rainer Pottel
1982: Torsten Voss
1983: Torsten Voss
1984: Uwe Freimuth
1985: Uwe Freimuth
1986: Uwe Freimuth
1987: Torsten Voss
1988: Uwe Freimuth
1989: René Günther
1990: Torsten Voss

West Germany

1980: Guido Kratschmer
1981: Andreas Rizzi
1982: Jürgen Hingsen
1983: Siegfried Wentz
1984: Not held
1985: Siegfried Wentz
1986: Jens Schulze
1987: Michael Neugebauer
1988: Rainer Sonnenburg
1989: Karl-Heinz Fichtner
1990: Michael Kohnle

Unified Germany

1991: Christian Schenk
1992: Stefan Schmid
1993: Christian Schenk
1994: Norbert Demmel
1995: Michael Kohnle
1996: Stefan Schmid
1997: Mike Maczey
1998: Dirk-Achim Pajonk
1999: Mike Maczey
2000: Florian Schönbeck
2001: Jörg Goedicke
2002: Florian Schönbeck
2003: Matthias Spahn
2004: Christopher Hallmann
2005: Jacob Minah
2006: Lars Albert
2007: Lars Albert
2008: Norman Müller
2009: Jan Felix Knobel
2010: Michael Schrader
2011: André Niklaus
2012: Kai Kazmirek

Hungary

1980: László Nagy
1981: Árpád Kiss
1982: József Hoffer
1983: József Hoffer
1984: József Hoffer
1985: Béla Vágó
1986: Béla Vágó
1987: Dezső Szabó
1988: Dezső Szabó
1989: Dezső Szabó
1990: Dezső Szabó
1991: Dezső Szabó
1992: Sándor Munkácsi
1993: Sándor Munkácsi
1994: Zsolt Kürtösi
1995: Sándor Munkácsi
1996: Márk Váczi
1997: Sándor Munkácsi
1998: Zsolt Kürtösi
1999: Viktor Kovács
2000: Zsolt Kürtösi
2001: Tamás Polonyi
2002: Zsolt Kürtösi
2003: Zsolt Kürtösi
2004: Zsolt Kürtösi
2005: Péter Skoumal
2006:
2007: Attila Szabó
2008:
2009: Attila Szabó

Japan

1980: Hirokazu Kobayashi
1981: Mitsugi Ogata
1982: Mitsugi Ogata
1983: Takeshi Kojo
1984: Takeshi Kojo
1985: Takeshi Kojo
1986: Takeshi Kojo
1987: Takeshi Kojo
1988: Katsuhiko Matsuda
1989: Katsuhiko Matsuda
1990: Munehiro Kaneko
1991: Munehiro Kaneko
1992: Munehiro Kaneko
1993: Munehiro Kaneko
1994: Munehiro Kaneko
1995: Munehiro Kaneko
1996: Munehiro Kaneko
1997: Sō Takei
1998: Hitoshi Maruono
1999: Tomokazu Sugama
2000: Hitoshi Maruono
2001: Takuro Hirata
2002: Masatoshi Ishizawa
2003: Takuro Hirata
2004: Hiromasa Tanaka
2005: Hiromasa Tanaka
2006: Hiromasa Tanaka
2007: Hiromasa Tanaka
2008: Hiromasa Tanaka
2009: Daisuke Ikeda
2010: Keisuke Ushiro
2011: Keisuke Ushiro
2012: Keisuke Ushiro
2013: Keisuke Ushiro
2014: Keisuke Ushiro
2015: Keisuke Ushiro
2016: Akihiko Nakamura
2017: Keisuke Ushiro
2018: Keisuke Ushiro
2019: Keisuke Ushiro

Latvia

1991: Rojs Piziks
1992: Ronalds Blûms
1993: Rojs Piziks
1994: Gvido Einbergs
1995: Rojs Piziks
1996: Rojs Piziks
1997: Mârcis Rullis
1998: Intars Dîcmanis
1999: Egons Lâcis
2000: Aigars Brûveris
2001: Normunds Jakušonoks
2002: Atis Vaisjûns
2003: Jânis Karlivâns
2004: Jânis Karlivâns
2005: Atis Vaisjûns
2006: Atis Vaisjûns

Lithuania

1990: Tomas Onuškevicius
1991: Rišardas Malachovskis
1992: Tomas Onuškevicius
1993: Audrius Rankelé
1994: Tomas Onuškevicius
1995: Ramûnas Pugžlys
1996: no contest
1997: Ramûnas Pugžlys
1998: Regimantas Kicas
1999: Regimantas Kicas
2000: Jonas Spudis
2001: Jonas Spudis
2002: Gvidas Vorotinskas
2003: Mindaugas Šerepka
2004: Jonas Spudis
2005: Aivaras Aksionovas
2006: Aidas Aleksonis

Netherlands

1980: Frans van der Ham
1981: Robert de Wit
1982: Robert de Wit
1983: Guido van der Sluis
1984: Robert de Wit
1985: Enno Tjepkema
1986: Nick Mosselman
1987: Cor Troost
1988: Robert de Wit
1989: Yvo van den Heuvel
1990: Enno Tjepkema
1991: Marcel Dost
1992: Marcel Dost
1993: Ruben van Balen
1994: Marcel Dost
1995: Remco van Veldhuizen
1996: Jack Rosendaal
1997: Bart Bennema
1998: Chiel Warners
1999: Jack Rosendaal
2000: Chiel Warners
2001: Rick Wassenaar
2002: Rick Wassenaar
2003: Eugene Martineau
2004: Joost van Bennekom
2005: Ludo van der Plaat
2006: Ludo van der Plaat
2007: Pelle Rietveld
2008: Ludo van der Plaat
2009: Ludo van der Plaat
2010: Alwin Roobeek
2011: Adriaan Saman
2012: Harald Bust
2013: Bas Markies
2014: Bas Markies

New Zealand

1980: Robert Sadler
1981: Grant Connon
1982: Grant Connon
1983: Paul Wilson
1984: Simon Poelman
1985: Simon Poelman
1986: Simon Poelman
1987: Simon Poelman
1988: Terry Lomax
1989: Terry Lomax
1990: Simon Poelman
1991: Simon Poelman
1992: Simon Poelman
1993: Doug Pirini
1994: Grant Chapman
1995: Doug Pirini
1996: Doug Pirini
1997: Gene Pateman
1998: Doug Pirini
1999: Gene Pateman
2000: Sean Gourley
2001: David Hansen
2002: Sean Gourley
2003: Scott McLaren
2004: Peter Cox
2005: Brent Newdick
2006: Brent Newdick
2007: None
2008: Kris McCarthy (Australia)
2009: Brent Newdick
2010: Brent Newdick
2011: Brent Newdick
2012: Nicholas Gerrard

Poland

1980: Janusz Szczerkowski
1981: Marek Kubiszewski
1982: Wojciech Podsiadło
1983: Maciej Jędral
1984: Wojciech Podsiadło
1985: Marek Kubiszewski
1986: Janusz Leśniewicz
1987: Wojciech Podsiadło
1988: Dariusz Grad
1989: Dariusz Grad
1990: Andrzej Wyżykowski
1991: Sebastian Chmara
1992: Michał Krukowski
1993: Grzegorz Stromiński
1994: Sebastian Chmara
1995: Grzegorz Stromiński
1996: Maciej Chmara
1997: Maciej Chmara
1998: Michał Modelski
1999: Michał Modelski
2000: Michał Modelski
2001: Michał Modelski
2002: Krzysztof Andrzejak
2003: Krzysztof Andrzejak
2004: Michał Modelski
2005: Łukasz Płaczek
2006: Łukasz Płaczek
2007: Marcin Dróżdż
2008: Marcin Dróżdż
2009: Łukasz Płaczek
2010: Jacek Nabożny
2011: Marcin Dróżdż
2012: Paweł Wiesiołek
2013: Marcin Przybył
2014: Paweł Wiesiołek
2015: Paweł Wiesiołek
2016: Paweł Wiesiołek
2017: Rafał Abramowski
2018: Paweł Wiesiołek
2019: Paweł Wiesiołek

Portugal

1980: João Campos
1981: Pedro Albuquerque Martins
1982: Pedro Albuquerque Martins
1983: Pedro Albuquerque Martins
1984: Pedro Albuquerque Martins
1985: Joaquim Carvalho
1986: Carlos Cunha
1987: Paulo Barrigana
1988: José Durão
1989: José Durão
1990: Mário Aníbal Ramos
1991: José Durão
1992: Francisco Nuno Fernandes
1993: Mário Aníbal Ramos
1994: Mário Aníbal Ramos
1995: Mário Aníbal Ramos
1996: Luís Herédio Costa
1997: Paulo Massinga
1998: Pedro Veloso
1999: Pedro Veloso
2000: Mário Aníbal Ramos
2001: Mário Aníbal Ramos
2002: Carlos Sá
2003: Mário Aníbal Ramos
2004: Carlos Sá
2005: Tiago Marto
2006: Cláudio Gama
2007: Tiago Marto
2008: Tiago Marto
2009: -
2010: Tiago Marto
2011: Tiago Marto
2012: Tiago Marto

Sweden

1980: Christer Lythell
1981: Christer Lythell
1982: Conny Silfver
1983: Conny Silfver
1984: Staffan Blomstrand
1985: Sten Ekberg
1986: Mikael Olander
1987: Sten Ekberg
1988: Bengt Järlsjö
1989: Henrik Dagård
1990: Sten Ekberg
1991: Sten Ekberg
1992: Sten Ekberg
1993: Glenn Håkansson
1994: Einar Cronstedt
1995: Robert Wärff
1996: Robert Wärff
1997: Michael Hoffer
1998: Henrik Dagård
1999: Michael Hoffer
2000: Christer Holger
2001: Patrik Melin
2002: Andrus Klaar
2003: Andrus Klaar
2004: Patrik Melin
2005: Daniel Almgren
2006: Daniel Almgren
2007: Daniel Almgren
2008: Björn Barrefors

Switzerland

1980: Michele Rüfenacht
1981: Stephan Niklaus
1982: Stephan Niklaus
1983: Stephan Niklaus
1984: Michele Rüfenacht
1985: Christian Gugler
1986: Beat Gähwiler
1987: Michele Rüfenacht
1988: Beat Gähwiler
1989: Jann Trefny
1990: Beat Gähwiler
1991: Beat Gähwiler
1992: Beat Gähwiler
1993: Mirko Spada
1994: Mirko Spada
1995: Rolf Schläfli
1996: Beat Gähwiler
1997: Philipp Huber
1998: Rolf Schläfli
1999: Ronald Thalmann
2000: Adrian Krebs
2001: Adrian Krebs
2002: Daniel Weder
2003: Xavier Weibel
2004: David Gervasi
2005: David Gervasi

Ukraine 

1992: Vitaliy Kolpakov
1993: Vitaliy Kolpakov
1994: Serhiy Blonskyi
1995: Serhiy Blonskyi
1996: Victor Dyshlyak
1997: Volodymyr Mykhailenko
1998: Volodymyr Mykhailenko
1999: Yuriy Zhuravskyi
2000: Fedir Laukhin
2001: Serhiy Blonskyi
2002: ???
2003: Fedir Laukhin
2004: Oleksandr Yurkov
2005: Yuriy Blonskyi
2006: Mykola Shulga
2007: Mykola Shulga
2008: ???
2009: Yevhen Nikitin
2010: Yevhen Nikitin
2011: Yevhen Nikitin
2012: ???
2013: Vasyl Ivanytskyi
2014: Vasyl Ivanytskyi
2015: Serhiy Yarokhovych
2016: Vasyl Ivanytskyi
2017: Serhiy Yarokhovych
2018: Vasyl Ivanytskyi
2019: Ruslan Maloglovets
2020: Oleksiy Kasyanov

United States

1980: Bobby Coffman
1981: John Crist
1982: Mark Anderson
1983: Mark Anderson
1984: John Crist
1985: John Sayre
1986: Dave Johnson
1987: Tim Bright
1988: Gary Kinder
1989: Dave Johnson
1990: Dave Johnson
1991: Dan O'Brien
1992: Dave Johnson
1993: Dan O'Brien
1994: Dan O'Brien
1995: Dan O'Brien
1996: Dan O'Brien
1997: Steve Fritz
1998: Chris Huffins
1999: Chris Huffins
2000: Tom Pappas
2001: Kip Janvrin
2002: Tom Pappas
2003: Tom Pappas
2004: Bryan Clay
2005: Bryan Clay
2006: Tom Pappas
2007: Tom Pappas
2008: Bryan Clay
2009: Trey Hardee
2010: Jake Arnold
2011: Ashton Eaton
2012: Ashton Eaton WR
2013: Ashton Eaton
2014: Trey Hardee
2015: Trey Hardee
2016: Ashton Eaton
2017: Trey Hardee
2018: Zach Ziemek
2019: Devon Williams

References

 GBRathletics
 Decathlon Site
 decateam belgique

Men
Decathlon
National